Vicki Lopez is an American politician. She serves as a Republican member for the 113th district of the Florida House of Representatives.

Life and career 
Lopez attended the University of Notre Dame.

In August 2022, Lopez defeated Alberto Perosch in the Republican primary election for the 113th district of the Florida House of Representatives. In November 2022, she defeated Alessandro D'Amico in the general election, winning 51 percent of the votes.

References 

Living people
Year of birth missing (living people)
Place of birth missing (living people)
Republican Party members of the Florida House of Representatives
21st-century American politicians
21st-century American women politicians
21st-century American women
University of Notre Dame alumni